Matthew "Matt" McConnell is a professional rugby league footballer who played in the 2000s.

International honours
Matt McConnell won caps for Ireland while at Barrow Raiders 2004 3-caps.

References

Barrow Raiders players
Ireland national rugby league team players
Living people
Place of birth missing (living people)
Rugby league second-rows
Year of birth missing (living people)